Spanish Fork may refer to:

 Enciclopedia Libre Universal en Español - a fork of the Spanish language Wikipedia
 Spanish Fork, a stream in Boise County, Idaho, northwest of Idaho City
 Spanish Fork, Utah, a city in southern Utah County
 Spanish Fork High School
 Spanish Fork Canyon, a canyon through which the Spanish Fork (river) and Soldier Creek flow, southeast of the city
 Spanish Fork (river), a river that flows through Spanish Fork Canyon, through the city of Spanish Fork, and into Utah Lake